Ichneutica paraxysta is a moth of the family Noctuidae. It is endemic to New Zealand. This species is very similar in appearance to its close relative I. acontistis but as the range of the two species do not overlap this is unlikely to cause confusion. I. paraxysta is only found in the North Island at the subalpine zones in the Mount Taranaki region and at Mount Ruapehu. It prefers tussock grassland and shrubland habitat. The life history of this species is unknown as are the host species of its larvae however it has been hypothesised that the larval host plants are species in the genera of Poa and Festuca.

Taxonomy 
This species was first described by Edward Meyrick in 1929 from specimens collected around Waiouru by George Hudson and named Leucania paraxysta. The lectotype specimen is held at the Natural History Museum, London. In 1971 John S. Dugdale transferred all the New Zealand species in the genus Leucania to the genus Tmetolophota. In 1988 J. S. Dugdale, in his catalogue of New Zealand Lepidoptera, confirmed this placement.  In 2019 Robert Hoare undertook a major review of New Zealand Noctuidae species. During this review the genus Ichneutica was greatly expanded and the genus Tmetolophota was subsumed into that genus as a synonym. As a result of this review, this species is now known as Ichneutica paraxysta.

Description 
Meyrick described this species as follows:

The wingspan of the adult male of the species is between 34 and 38 mm and for the female is between 34 and 38 mm. I. paraxysta is a pale, medium-sized moth. Its hindwings are slightly darker than its forewings, and veins on the latter are clearly defined. This species is very similar in appearance to I. acontistis, however this is unlikely to be confusion between these species as I. acontistis is only found in the South Island.

Distribution 

I. paraxysta is endemic to New Zealand. It is found in the North Island only, in the Mount Taranaki region and at Mount Ruapehu.

Habitat 
This species is found at subalpine altitudes in native tussock grasslands and  shrubland.

Behaviour 
Adults of this species is on the wing from November to January.

Life history and host species 
The life history of this species is unknown as are the host species of its larvae. Hoare hypothesised that as a result of its similarity to I. acontistis  the larval host species are likely to be species in the genera Poa and Festuca.

References

Moths described in 1929
Moths of New Zealand
Endemic fauna of New Zealand
Hadeninae
Taxa named by Edward Meyrick
Endemic moths of New Zealand